Haden is both a surname and a given name. Notable people with the name include:

Surname 
Andy Haden (born 1950), New Zealand rugby union player
Ben Haden, American minister in the Presbyterian Church
Charles Harold Haden II (1937–2004), United States federal judge
Charlie Haden (1937–2014), American jazz musician
Sir Francis Seymour Haden, (1818-1910), English surgeon and etcher
George Haden (1788–1856), British engineer and inventor
J. V. Haden (dates unknown), English cricketer
Jack Haden (1914–1996), American football player
Joe Haden (born 1989), American footballer
Josh Haden  (born 1968), American jazz musician
Nate Haden (born 1976), American actor
Oliver Haden, British actor
Pat Haden (born 1953), American football player, lawyer and athletic director
Petra Haden (born 1971), American violinist and singer
Rachel Haden (born 1971), American bass guitarist and singer
Sam Haden (born 1902), English soccer player
Sara Haden (1899–1981), American character actress
Tanya Haden (born 1971), American artist, cellist and singer

Peerage
Baron Haden-Guest, a title in the Peerage of the United Kingdom
Leslie Haden-Guest, 1st Baron Haden-Guest (1877–1960), British politician
David Haden-Guest (1911–1938), British communist and son of the 1st Baron
Peter Haden-Guest, 4th Baron Haden-Guest (1913–1996), British dancer, choreographer, diplomet, and son of the 1st Baron
Elisabeth Haden-Guest (1910–2002), German-British communist, 1st wife of the 4th Baron
Jean Haden-Guest, Lady Haden-Guest (1921-2017), American theatre director and television executive, 2nd wife of the 4th Baron
Anthony Haden-Guest (born 1937), British-American writer and artist, son of the 4th Baron
Nicholas Haden-Guest (born 1951), American actor, son of the 4th Baron
Christopher Haden-Guest, 5th Baron Haden-Guest (born 1948), American-British actor, director, and screenwriter, son of the 4th Baron
Jamie Lee Curtis, Lady Haden-Guest (born 1958), American actress, wife of the 4th Baron
Ruby Haden-Guest (born 1996), American-British computer gaming editor, daughter of the 4th Baron

Given name 

Haden Edwards (1771–1849), Texas settler and land speculator
Haden Harrison Edwards (1812–1864), Texan legislator, merchant soldier

Fictional characters 

David Haden, Executive ADA appearing on Law & Order: Special Victims Unit

See also
Hayden (given name)
Hayden (surname)